Panopea smithae is a species of large marine bivalve mollusc in the Panopea (geoduck) genus of the family Hiatellidae, found in the waters surrounding New Zealand. While its relative Panopea zelandica lives in shallow waters, P. smithae lives in deeper waters, ranging from deep harbours to the outer continental shelf.

References

 Powell, A.W.B. (1979). New Zealand Mollusca. William Collins Publishers, Auckland, New Zealand. 

Hiatellidae
Bivalves of New Zealand
Bivalves described in 1835